Mariani C. Dimaranan (February 1, 1925 – December 17, 2005), also known as Sister Mariani, was a Catholic nun and activist in the Philippines who fought against the dictatorship of Ferdinand Marcos.

Dimaranan headed Task Force Detainees of the Philippines, created in the early years of martial law in the Philippines by the Association of Major Religious Superiors of the Philippines to investigate and document human rights abuses.

She became a political detainee in 1973 after she was accused of being a communist. She was also accused of writing articles against Marcos. Dimaranan denied the charges against her.

Her name is inscribed on the Bantayog ng mga Bayani Wall of Remembrance, a memorial that honors martyrs and heroes who fought the dictatorship.

References 

1925 births
2005 deaths
20th-century Filipino Roman Catholic nuns
Filipino activists
Individuals honored at the Bantayog ng mga Bayani
21st-century Filipino Roman Catholic nuns
History of the Philippines (1965–1986)
Martial law under Ferdinand Marcos
Political repression in the Philippines
Presidency of Ferdinand Marcos
Religious workers honored at the Bantayog ng mga Bayani